Apamea or Apameia was a Hellenistic city on the left (viz., the eastern) bank of the Euphrates, opposite the famous city of Zeugma, at the end of a bridge of boats (Greek:  zeugma) connecting the two, founded by Seleucus I Nicator (Pliny, v. 21).

The ancient term Zeugma actually referred to the twin cities on the opposing banks of the river. Today the name Zeugma is usually understood to refer to the settlement on the west bank, called Seleucia after the founder, while the one on the East bank was called Apamea after his Persian wife Apama.

See also
 List of ancient Greek cities

References

External links
Hazlitt, Classical Gazetteer, "Apamea"
Map of Zeugma showing Apamea across the river

Ancient Greek archaeological sites in Turkey
Seleucid colonies
Populated places in Osroene
Twin cities
Former populated places in Turkey
Euphrates
History of Şanlıurfa Province
Submerged places